Mont Puget is a mountain, part of Marseille-Cassis calanques, located south-east of Marseille. Like most Marseille mountains, it is formed from limestone.

Tourism 

Often neglected by tourists, much interested by the Calanques themselves and by the sea, the Mont Puget can provide for some interesting hiking and climbing.

A very good trail leads to the very top of the mountain (like on most of Marseille mountain ranges, so that firefighters can get everywhere should a fire start).

However, one can also climb the mountain directly, which can provide many interesting experiences.

One of them are "stone rivers", or collections of numerous small stones "flowing" from the mountain at angles reaching 45 degrees.

The top of the mountain is covered with eroded limestone that sticks out in numerous needle-like spikes.

Crest of Luminy University
A stylized representation of Mont Puget is displayed on the crest of Luminy Faculty of Sciences, part of the University of the Mediterranean Aix-Marseille II. The Luminy campus is located 1 km northwest of Mont Puget.

Name  
An urban legend insist that the mountain is named after the sculptor Pierre Puget which is a curious misconception since the mountain's name predates the sculptor on maps by several millennia. The name Puget is a diminutive from the Provençal word "puech" that originates from the Latin "podium", hence an elevated place that designates a certain eminence.

References 
 Marseille Tourism Office Information
 French Nationan Geographic Institute maps (for altitude figure)

External links
 Le massif des Calanques
 A satellite view of Mont Puget the city and the university campus are on the left, the road at the top is Marseille-Cassis road (the Gineste).

Landforms of Bouches-du-Rhône
Geography of Marseille
Mountains of Provence-Alpes-Côte d'Azur
Massif des Calanques